The following are the national records in athletics in São Tomé and Príncipe maintained by São Tomé and Príncipe's national athletics federation: Federaçao Santomense de Atletismo (FSA).

Outdoor

Key to tables:

+ = en route to a longer distance

h = hand timing

Men

Women

Indoor

Men

Women

References

External links

São Tomé and Príncipe
Records
Athletics